= British Columbia Search and Rescue Volunteer Memorial =

Monument in Victoria, British Columbia, Canada

Coordinates: 48.4185°N 123.3703°W

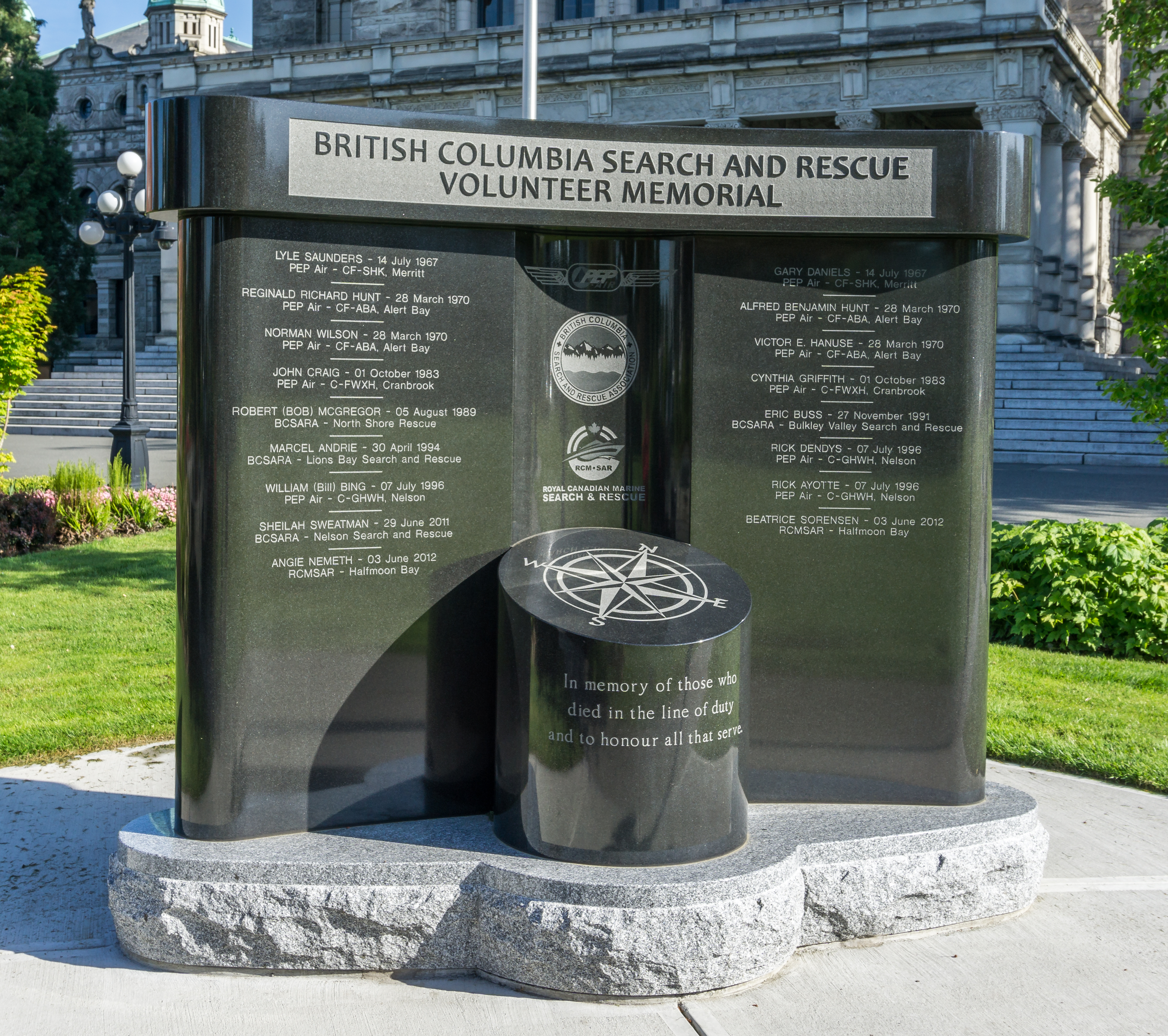
- The memorial in 2018
- Location: Victoria, British Columbia, Canada

The British Columbia Search and Rescue Volunteer Memorial, located in Victoria, British Columbia, commemorates volunteers who serve, including those who died in the line of duty. The memorial was unveiled on March 2, 2017.
